Zita Szucsánszki (born 22 May 1987) is a Hungarian handball player for Ferencvárosi TC and the Hungarian national team.

She made her international debut on 4 November 2006 against Slovakia, and represented Hungary in the 2020 Summer Olympics, five World Championships (2007, 2009, 2013, 2015, 2017) and four European Championships (2008, 2010, 2012, 2014).

In recognition of her performances and achievements throughout the year, she was voted the Hungarian Handballer of the Year in 2011, in 2015 and in 2016.

Achievements
Nemzeti Bajnokság I:
Winner: 2007, 2015, 2021
Silver Medalist: 2006, 2009, 2012, 2013, 2014, 2016, 2017, 2018, 2019
Bronze Medalist: 2008, 2011
Magyar Kupa:
Winner: 2017
Silver Medalist: 2007, 2010, 2013, 2014, 2015
Bronze Medalist: 2006, 2016, 2018, 2021
EHF Cup:
Winner: 2006
EHF Cup Winners' Cup:
Winner: 2011, 2012
Semifinalist: 2007
EHF Champions Trophy:
Fourth Placed: 2006
European Championship:
Bronze Medalist: 2012

Individual awards
 Hungarian Handballer of the Year: 2011, 2015, 2016

Personal life
She is married to handball coach, Gábor Elek. Their son, Levente was born in June 2019.

References

External links
Profile Official Website
Career statistics at Worldhandball

1987 births
Living people
Hungarian female handball players
Handball players from Budapest
Ferencvárosi TC players (women's handball)
Handball players at the 2020 Summer Olympics